Anadoras regani is a species of thorny catfish found in the Oyapock and Amazon basins of Brazil, French Guiana, and Colombia. This species grows to a length of  SL. The IUCN Red List considers it a junior synonym of Anadoras weddellii.

Although the patronym was not identified it is probably in honor of ichthyologist Charles Tate Regan (1878–1943), of the Natural History Museum in London.

References

Doradidae
Catfish of South America
Fish of the Amazon basin
Freshwater fish of Brazil
Freshwater fish of Colombia
Fish of French Guiana
Taxa named by Franz Steindachner
Fish described in 1908